Arsenal of Megadeth is a DVD by American heavy metal band Megadeth, released on March 21, 2006 via Capitol. Presented as an anthology of the band's first 20 years, the two-disc DVD set contains music videos, live performances, interviews, home videos, and special appearances. As a result of licensing issues, videos from soundtrack and non-Capitol albums are not featured, save for "No More Mr. Nice Guy" and "Go to Hell" as well as despite being on Risk, "Crush 'Em" and "Breadline" were not included (though the former along with its accompanying album was also a soundtrack song it is unknown whether its exclusion was a result of the same reason as the other excluded soundtrack videos while reasons for the latter not being featured have never been disclosed). Arsenal of Megadeth was certified gold in the United States and platinum in Canada and Argentina."

Track listing

Disc one 
 Excerpt from Talk Radio
(1986)
 "Peace Sells" music video
 1986 interview
 "Wake Up Dead" music video
(1988)
 Penelope Spheeris Cutting Edge Happy Hour interview
 "In My Darkest Hour" music video
 So Far, So Good... So What! interview
 "Anarchy in the U.K." music video
 "No More Mr. Nice Guy" music video
(1990)
 Marty Friedman audition
 Rust in Peace TV spot
 Clash of the Titans tour, 1990
 "Holy Wars... The Punishment Due" music video
 Excerpt from Headbangers Ball 1991
 "Hangar 18" music video
 "Go to Hell" music video
(1992)
 Rock the Vote 3 promo clips
Countdown to Extinction TV spot
 "Symphony of Destruction" music video
 "Symphony of Destruction" edited music video
 "Skin o' My Teeth" music video
 "High Speed Dirt" music video
 "Foreclosure of a Dream" music video
 Excerpt from A Day in the Life of Hollywood
 "Sweating Bullets" music video

Disc two
(1994)
 Excerpt from Evolver
 "Train of Consequences" music video
 Making of the "Train of Consequences" music video
 Youthanasia TV spot
 1994 interview
 Excerpt from Night of the Living Megadeth
 Excerpt from MTV Most Wanted 1995
 1994 interview
 "A Tout le Monde" music video
 1994 interview
 "Reckoning Day" music video
(1997)
 Cryptic Writings TV spot
 "Trust" music video
 Making of the "Trust" music video
 Cryptic TV
 "Almost Honest" music video
 "A Secret Place" music video
 1998 interview
 Excerpt from The Drew Carey Show 1998
(1999)
 Risk promo
 "Insomnia" music video
(2005)
 "Sweating Bullets" live at Gigantour 2005
 "Peace Sells" live at Gigantour 2005

Trivia
The writing on the bomb on the cover art is in Hangul (Korean).
 메가데스 = Megadeth
 병기창 = "Military Bank", "Ordnance Depot", "Arsenal"
 메가데스 병기창 = "Arsenal of Megadeth"
A mark of North Korean army is also seen on the upper side of the bomb.

Personnel
 Dave Mustaine: guitars, lead vocals (1983–present)
 David Ellefson: bass, backing vocals (1983–2002, 2010–2021)
 Marty Friedman: guitars, acoustic guitar (1990–2000)
 Chris Poland: lead guitar (1984–1987)
 Jeff Young: lead guitar (1987–1989)
 Glen Drover: lead guitar (2004–2008)
 Gar Samuelson: drums (1984–1987)
 Chuck Behler: drums (1987–1988)
 Nick Menza: drums (1990–1998)
 Jimmy DeGrasso: drums (1998–2002)
 Shawn Drover: drums (2004–2014)
 James MacDonough: bass (2004–2006)

Charts

Certifications

References

Megadeth video albums
2006 video albums
Live video albums
2006 live albums
Megadeth live albums